Greek dance (choros) is a very old tradition, being referred to by authors such as Plato, Aristotle, Plutarch and Lucian. There are different styles and interpretations from all of the islands and surrounding mainland areas. Each region formed its own choreography and style to fit in with their own ways. For example, island dances have more of a different smooth flow to them, while Pontic dancing closer to the Black Sea, is very sharp. There are over 10,000 traditional dances that come from all regions of Greece. There are also pan-Hellenic dances, which have been adopted throughout the Greek world. These include specifically the Syrtos, Kalamatianos, Pyrrhichios, Ballos and hasapiko.

Traditional Greek dancing has a primarily social function. It brings the community together at key points of the year, such as Easter, the grape harvest or patronal festivals; and at key points in the lives of individuals and families, such as weddings. For this reason, tradition frequently dictates a strict order in the arrangement of the dancers, for example, by age.

Greek dances are performed also in diaspora Greek communities among international folk dance groups.

Ancient Greek dances

Antistrophe
Carpaea
Choreia (dance)
Cordax
Dionysiakos
Hyporchema
Korybantes
Pyrrhichios (dance)
Syrtos
In Ancient Greece, dance was a form of ritual, as well as a pastime. Dance could be included in hunting communities, initiation ceremony rituals of age, marriage, and death, entertainment, dance festivals, and religious activity. It was also viewed as a way to educate children about social norms and morals, and was viewed as being essential for physical and emotional development. Dance was used in regard to war as a form of military training, as well as a ritual that served as a mediator between the gods and humans. What modern times may consider a parade, military drill, funeral, children’s game, these were seen as forms of dance as long as they were meant to be an exhibition of a rhythmic performance. Suda mention an ancient Greek dance which was called Dipodia (Διποδία), meaning two-step/two-footer.

Modern and regional dances

Aegean Islands

The Aegean islands have dances which are fast in pace and light and jumpy. Many of these dances, however, are couples dances, and not so much in lines. See Nisiotika for more information.

Antikristos (Mytilene)
Antipatitis (Karpathos)
Arkistis (Karpathos)
Ballaristos
Ballos (Naxos, Kythnos, Lemnos)
Boniatiki Sousta (Rhodes)
Chaniotika (Leros)
Ikariotikos (from Ikaria)
Irene (Tilos)
Isios (Kalymnos)
Kamara (Skiathos)
Kamares (Tilos)
Karavas (dance) (Naxos)
Kato Choros (Karpathos)
Kechagiadikos (Lemnos)
Kefalonitika (Karpathos)
Kritikos (Rhoditiko Pidikto) (Rhodes)
Leriki Sousta (Leros)
Lerikos (Leros)
Michanikos (Kalymnos)
Ola Ta Poulakia (Thasos)
Panagia (Lemnos)
Pano Choros (Karpathos)
Patma (Lemnos)
Pirgousikos (Chios)
Plataniotiko Nero (Samos)
Rhoditiki Sousta (Rhodes)
Rhoditikos (Rhodes, Leros)
Rodo (dance)
Sianos (Karpathos)
Simetherkatos (Lemnos)
Samiotiki Sousta (Samos)
Sousta (Kalymnos)
Sousta Karpathou (Karpathos)
Sousta Koaki (Kos)
Sousta Tilou (Tilos)
Sperveri (Rhodes)
Strose Vayia (Samos)
Symiaki Sousta (Symi)
Syrtos
Syrtos Assos (Agathonisi)
Ta Xila (Mytilene)
Thermiotikos Karsilamas (Kythnos)
Thimariotikos (Kalymnos)
Tourtsikos (Rhodes)
Trata
Tsopanikos (Lemnos)
Zervos (Karpathos)

Crete

These dances are light and jumpy, and extremely cardiovascular.

Angaliastos
Anogianos Pidichtos
Apanomeritis
Ethianos Pidichtos
Ierapetrikos Pidichtos
Kanella
Katsabadianos
Laziotis
Maleviziotis
Mikro Mikraki
Ntames
Ntournerakia
Pentozali
Pidichtos Lasithou
Pyrrhichios
Priniotis
Rethemniotiki Sousta
Rodo (dance)
Siganos
Sitiakos Pidichtos
Sousta
Syrtos Chaniotikos
Trizali
Xenobasaris
Zervodexos

Central Greece

Antikristos
Hasapiko
Sirtaki
Hatzichristos (from Megara)
Kalamatianos
Kavodorikos (Karystos)
Kleistos
Pyrrhichios
Syrtos
Lambri Kamara (Megara)
Loulouvikos (from Megara)
Tis Triantafilias Ta Fila (Megara)
Trata (from Megara)
Tsamikos

Epirus

Epirote dances are the most slow and heavy in all of Greece. Great balance is required in order to perform these dances.

Berati
Tsamikos
Fisounis
Genovefa
Giatros
Horos Tis Nifis or Lipothimarikos
Kapitan Louka
Koftos
Klamata
Metsovitikos
Palamakia
Papadia
Papiggo
Parzakana
Pogonisios
Sta Dio
Sta Tria
Singathistos Metsovou
Zagorisios

Peloponnese
The dances of the Peloponnese are very simple and heavy, with the leader of the line improvising.

Ai Georgis
Diplos Horos
Geranos
Kalamatianos
Maniatikos
Monodiplos
Panagiotis (dance)
Syrtos
Tsakonikos
Tsamikos

Ionian Islands

Ai Georgis (Corfu)
Ballos (Lefkada, Cefalonia)
Bourdaris (Kythira)
Cerigotikos (Kythira)
Potamitikos (Kythira)
Ai Georgis (Kythira)
Divaratikos (Cefalonia)
Fourlana (Corfu)
Kerkiraikos (Corfu)
Lefkaditikos (Lefkada)
Levantitikos (Zakynthos)
Mermigas (Cefalonia)
Mesaritikos (Kythira)
Rouga (Corfu)
Syrtos (Cefalonia)
Thiakos (Lefkada)

Macedonia
Dances in Macedonia vary. Most are solid and are performed using heavy steps, whilst others are fast and agile. Most dances begin slow and increase in speed.

Western Macedonia
Akritikos (Florina)
Antikristos
Bougatsas (Florina)
Dimitroula
Diplos Choros Tis Rokas
Gaida Dance
Gerakina
Gerontikos
Endeka Kozanis
Kastorianos
Kori Eleni
Kapitan Louka
Hasapiko
Leventikos (Florina)
Makedonikos antikristos
Makrinitsa dance
Nizamikos (Naousa)
Omorfoula (Florina)
O Nikolos
Partalos
Poustseno
Proskinitos
Raikos (Edessa)
Servikos
Simbethera (Florina)
Stamoulo
Stankina (Edessa)
Syre Syre (Edessa)
Syrtos Makedonias
Tis Dimitroulas
Tis Marias
Tranos Choros (Kozani)
Trita Pata (Naousa)
Tsamikos Deskatis
Tsotsos (Florina)
Tsourapia (Florina)
Zacharoula
Zaramo (dance)
Eastern Macedonia
Antikristos
Drousas
Kampana
Kori Eleni
Tefkotos

Thessaly
Dances in Thessaly are similar in style to the dances of Epirus. Mostly with slow, heavy movements. However, there are some dances that are also faster paced. The leader can improvise in these dances similarly to those dances from the Epirus, Central Greece and Peloponnese. 

Dionysiakos
Gaitanaki
Galanogalani
Girogalakis
Kalamatianos
Kamara
Kangeli
Karagouna
Kleistos
Kleistos Argitheas
Koftos
Lafina
Pilioritikos
Rougatsiarikos
Souzana
Syrtos
Tsamiko
Zacharoula

Arvanites
Ntarsa
Plektos
Tsamikos

Thrace
Thracian dance is generally skippy and light. In most Thracian dances, the men are only permitted to dance at the front of the line. Musicians and singers such as Chronis Aidonidis and Kariofilis Doitsidis have brought to life the music of Thrace.

Antikristos
Baidouska
Daktili
Dendritsi
Drista
Gaitani
Giknas
Hasapia
Koulouriastos
Mandilatos
Papisios
Singathistos
Syrtos
Tapeinos Horos
Tapeinos Paschaliatikos
Tripati
Zonaradiko

Northern Thrace / Eastern Thrace
The dances of (Northern Thrace) are fast, upbeat and similar to the Thracian style of dance. Dances from the town of Kavakli and Neo Monastiri are the most popular.

Antikristos
Bogdanos
Douzikos
Kallinitikos
Katsivelikos
Kinigitos
Koutsos
Miliso
Podaraki
Sfarlis
Singathistos
Stis Treis
Syrtos Banas
Tamzara
Tremouliastos
Troiro
Tsestos
Zervos
Zervos Banas
Zervodexios
Zonaradiko

Pontus
The dances of the Pontic Greeks from the Black Sea were mostly performed by the Pontic soldiers in order to motivate themselves before going into a battle. The dances are accompanied by the Pontian lyra, also called kemenche by Turkish people. Also included are dances traditionally performed by Caucasus Greeks and Greeks in Ukraine. See Horon for more information on the history of these dances.

Aneforitissa Kizela
Apo Pan Kai Ka Matsouka
Atsiapat
Dipat
Etere Trapezounta
Fona Argyroupolis
Gemoura
Getiere Argyroupolis
 Khaytarma
Kalon Koritsi
Kazatska
Kochari
Kori Kopela
Kounichton Nikopolis
Kousera
Lafraga
Letsi Kars (Kars)
Letsina Kars (Kars)
Macheria
Militsa
Miteritsa
Momoeria
Omal
Patoula
Podaraki
Pontic Serra
 Shalakho
Sampson (Samsun)
Seranitsa
Siton Imeras
Syrtos
Tamsara Nikopolis
Tamsara Trapezountas
Tas (Kars)
T'apan Ke Ka Matsouka
Tik Diplo
Tik Imeras
Tik Mono
Tik Nikopolis
Tik Togias or Togialidikon
Titara Argyroupolis
Tria Ti Kotsari
Trigona Kerasountas
Trigona Matsoukas
Trigona Trapezountas
Tripat Matsouka
Tromakton
 Tsifteteli
Tyrfon or Tryfon Bafra

Asia Minor

Erythrae
Alatsatiani
Horos Attaris
Ballos
Byzantine dance
Paschalinos
Geranos
Sousta
Syrtos
Syrtos Karabourniotikos
Tapeinos
Zeibekiko

Cappadocia
The Cappadocian dances were mainly sung in the Cappadocian dialect of Cappadocian Greeks or the Karamanlides. Dances varied from social dances to ritualistic dances.
Ai Vassiliatikos
Choros Koutalion
Choros Leilaloum
Choros Macherion
Choros Mandilion
Ensoma
Tas Kemerli
Tsitsek Ntag
Pasha/Antipasha
Leilaloum
Vara Vara
Konialis
Kouseftos
Sei Tata
Syrtos
Zeibekiko

Sinasos
The Dances & Songs of Sinasos Mustafapasa.
Apopsin Ta Mesanihta
Isos Sinasos
Koniali
Malamatenios Argalios
Pago Stou Prousas Ta Vouna
Simeris i Simeriani

Constantinople
Byzantine dance
Hasapiko
Tesera Matia
Patinada Nyfis
Rododachtilos

Griko (Southern Italy)
Pizzica
Tarantella

Cyprus

Men's Dances
Antikristos
Defteros Karsilamas
Protos Karsilamas
Syrtos
Tatsia
Tritos Karsilamas

Women's Dances
Antikristos
Defteros Karsilamas
Protos Karsilamas
Syrtos
Tetartos Karsilamas
Tritos Karsilamas

Aromanians
Antipera
Hatzistergiou
Kalamatianos
Kato Stin Aspri Petra
La Valia di Giannena
Sta Tria
Syrtos

Sarakatsani
Apano Stin Triantafilia
Choros Katsa
Despo
Diplos Choros
Sta Tria
Tsamikos

Greek dancing in the United States 
Within the United States, Greek Americans participate in Greek dancing in order to preserve their heritage and culture. Greeks of all ages can be seen showcasing their skills at Greek Festivals which take place year round, often hosted by Greek Orthodox churches, or at various competitions in which groups practice dances from specific parts of Greece in order to perform in front of judges.

Greek Orthodox Folk Dance and Choral Festival (FDF) 
Since 1976, the Greek Orthodox Metropolis of San Francisco has held a convention that allows Greek Dance groups from various churches in the Pacific Region of the United States to compete. Up to 3,000 people participate annually and it is described as the largest youth ministry program in the Metropolis of San Francisco. Within the competition, there are four divisions, two of which are judged and two of which are exhibition suites. Division I and Division II are judged by a table of judges who have done years of research in Greece and instructed others on the styling and other important elements of Greek dancing. Each competing team will be placed into a division and group based on the average age of the team. Each team performs two times and perfected suites that can be from many places in Greece (islands, mainland, villages) and feature many different dances. The judges will score the teams based on their costumes, singing, stage presence, styling, and how closely it resembles the region that their suite is from.

See also
Greek folk music
Dora Stratou
Greek musical instruments
Byzantine music
Assyrian folk dance
Armenian dance
Turkish dance

References

External links

In Greek - Traditional Dance by region
Greek Dance Archives
Video Examples of Regional Greek Dances
 Dance from region of Macedonia
 Dance from region of Macedonia
 Dance from region of Thessaly
 Dance from region of  Thessaly
 Dance from the region of  Thraki
 Dance from the region of Thraki
 Dances from the region of  Pontus
 Dances from the region of  Pontus
 Macedonian dances  Macedonia
  Macedonia

 
Dances
Greek music